Lubcroy  is a lodge in Glen Oykel,  in Sutherland, Scottish Highlands and is in the Scottish council area of Highland.

The A837 road passes through Lubcroy, running between Inveran and Lochinver.

References

Populated places in Sutherland